Tevis is a surname, and may refer to:

 James Henry Tevis (1837–1905), Arizona pioneer who founded Teviston
 Julia A. Tevis (1799–1880), pioneer educator of women from Kentucky
 Lloyd Tevis (1824–1899), American banker
 Paul Tevis, podcaster
 Peter Tevis (1937–2006), American folk singer 
 Sean Tevis (born 1969), American political candidate
 Walter Tevis (1928–1984), American writer
 Washington Carroll Tevis (1829–1900), American soldier of fortune